Edward Francis Harrison (July 25, 1927 – February 10, 2012) was a Canadian professional ice hockey player who played 194 games in the National Hockey League between 1947 and 1951 with the Boston Bruins and New York Rangers. He played with the New York Rangers and Boston Bruins. He was predeceased by his wife Helen and survived by his five children, eleven grandchildren, and two great-grandchildren.

Career statistics

Regular season and playoffs

References

External links
 

1927 births
2012 deaths
Boston Bruins players
Canadian ice hockey centres
Cincinnati Mohawks (AHL) players
Hershey Bears players
New York Rangers players
Ontario Hockey Association Senior A League (1890–1979) players
Quebec Aces (QSHL) players
St. Louis Flyers players
St. Michael's Buzzers players
Sportspeople from Etobicoke
Ice hockey people from Toronto
Syracuse Warriors players
Toronto St. Michael's Majors players
Vancouver Canucks (WHL) players
Washington Lions players